Frank Skinner's Opinionated is a British television comedy talk show hosted by the comedian Frank Skinner and produced by Avalon Television for the BBC. The show focusses on various topics in the previous week's news, with Skinner joined by two celebrity guests, also interacting with the studio audience. Each half-hour episode is filmed in a different location around the country. It was first shown on BBC Two, with a first series of six episodes broadcast from 16 April 2010, and a second of six more beginning on 25 March 2011. The third and final series began broadcasting on 10 November 2011.

Format 
The show is a studio based light hearted talk show focussing on events of the past week, with a large amount of audience participation while also having supporting film clips. Skinner opens the show on his own, and in the opening piece outlines what the general themes of the night's show will be. The two celebrity guests then enter the studio, and they proceed to discuss those topics in more detail, with Skinner guiding the discussion and inviting questions and comments from the audience, some of whom are pre-selected to talk about a specific topic.

Guests 
The two celebrity guests each week are all primarily known as or having originated in stand-up comedy, in addition to other regular appearances on comedy or light entertainment television. Some have appeared on more than one episode. The show has featured:
 Miranda Hart, creator and star of the sitcom Miranda
 Al Murray, creator of The Pub Landlord stand-up character
 Dave Gorman, creator of the stage show and TV series Are You Dave Gorman?
 Laura Solon, sketch comedy character actor and guest on the improv show Fast and Loose
 Lee Mack, team captain on the panel game Would I Lie to You? and creator and star of the sitcom Not Going Out
 Sarah Millican, stand-up comedian, regular guest on several comedy television and radio series, Loose Women panellist
 Karen Taylor, creator and star of the sketch show Touch Me, I'm Karen Taylor
 Jason Manford, team captain on the panel game 8 out of 10 Cats
 Patrick Kielty, host of several light entertainment series
 Ross Noble, regular guest on several television comedy shows, notably Have I Got News for You
 Katy Brand, sitcom actress and creator and star of Katy Brand's Big Ass Show
 Joseph Ireland, Classics teacher at Westminster School and keen speed-dater

Production 
A pilot for the show was recorded in December 2009 at BBC Television Centre in London. After the first series was completed, two more series were commissioned. Due to the nature of the series, filming of each episode occurs in the days just before broadcast. As such, when promoting the upcoming second series on the BBC's The One Show, Skinner could only refer to film from the previous series.

The studio set consists of just a red sofa and chair, with Skinner sitting in the individual seat, and the two guests on the sofa. The show is filmed in various studios around the UK, with the location also forming part of the discussion topics. Across the three series, Skinner visited Epic Studios in Norwich, Waterfront Hall in Belfast and regularly visited Dock10 at MediaCityUK, Greater Manchester. Other filming locations included Glasgow, London and Maidstone.

Broadcast 
Each series contains 6 half hour episodes, broadcast weekly in the 10pm slot on Friday nights on BBC Two. The first series ran from 16 April to 21 May 2010. The second series began on 25 March 2011 and finished on 29 April 2011.

Episodes

Series 1

Series 2

Series 3

Reception 
The first episode was watched by 1.877 million viewers, an 8.8% audience share, ahead of the first episode of Facejacker (1.186m) on Channel 4, and an episode of Grey's Anatomy (0.853m) on Five.

Music 
The song played during the credits and the interludes is "No Bulbs" by The Fall, Skinner's favourite group.

References

Further reading 
 Mark Lawson, "TV matters: Frank Skinner's Opinionated", The Guardian, 22 April 2010
 Benji Wilson, "Frank Skinner finds the funny side to political debate, interview", The Telegraph, 15 April 2010

External links

2010s British comedy television series
2010 British television series debuts
2011 British television series endings
BBC high definition shows
BBC television comedy
BBC television talk shows
English-language television shows
2010s British television talk shows